Mateusz Kowalczyk and Igor Zelenay were the defending champions, but chose not to defend their title.

Tomasz Bednarek and Nikola Mektić won the title after defeating Zdeněk Kolář and Matěj Vocel 6–4, 5–7, [10–7] in the final.

Seeds

Draw

References
 Main Draw

Sparta Prague Open - Doubles
2016 Doubles